Rachael Kane is an Australian pop singer, who released one studio album in 2003, produced by Peter Farnan.

Following its release, Kane took an extended break from music to reconsider her purpose with music and how she felt to go forward, later opening a business called Connected Voice, where she supports people to re-connect to their natural voice and express themselves freely in singing and in everyday life.

In 2021, Kane released Space with Benjamin Hurt.

Discography

Albums

Singles

References

Living people
Australian women pop singers
21st-century Australian singers
21st-century Australian women singers
Australian singer-songwriters
Year of birth missing (living people)